Duncan Stewart (born ?1732 at Ardsheal) was 10th Chief of the Clan Stewart of Appin and 6th of Ardsheal, and a friend of James Boswell. He was the eldest surviving son of Charles Stewart, 5th of Ardsheal, the Jacobite leader of the Clan at the Battle of Culloden, 16 April 1746, during the Jacobite Rising of 1745 and Isabel Haldane of Lanrick daughter of John Haldane 2nd of Lanrick.

Stewart was born at Ardsheal from where his father Charles Stewart (5th of Ardsheal)  had fled to France, dying at Sens, 15 March 1757, having escaped from Scotland in 1746. After the battle of Culloden he was sentenced to death in absentia and all his estates had been confiscated by the government.

Duncan Stewart became collector of customs in New London, Connecticut and later in Bermuda. During the American War of Independence Stewart supported the government against the rebels and was rewarded for his loyalty by having the estates in Ardsheal, Scotland returned to him in 1769 that had been confiscated from his father.

Stewart is remembered best for his portrait by John Singleton Copley held by the National Gallery of Scotland and for his friendship and travels with James Boswell. Stewart settled back in Scotland on his returned estates where he inherited the chieftainship of the Clan of Appin on the death of his cousin, Dugald Stewart, 9th of Appin.

Stewart married Anne Erving daughter of the Hon. John Erving, loyalist Governor of Boston, and a member of His Majesty's Council for the Province and his wife Anne Shirley of Shirley-Eustis House and daughter of William Shirley Governor of Massachusetts. Duncan Stewart and Anne Erving had 10 children including the prelate James Haldane Stewart.

Duncan Stewart died on September 12, 1793 in London and was buried in Old St. Pancras Churchyard. His grave is lost but is not listed on the 19th century monument erected to record the names of important lost graves.

References

1732 births
1793 deaths
Lords of Parliament in the Jacobite peerage
People from Argyll and Bute